The 2014 Westmeath Senior Hurling Championship is the 110th staging of the Westmeath Senior Hurling Championship since its establishment by the Westmeath County Board in 1889. The championship began on 19 July 2014.

Castletown Geoghegan were the defending champions, however, they were defeated in the semi-final stages.

Fixtures and results

Group stage

Semi-finals

Final

External links
 2014 WestmeathSenior Hurling Championship

References

Westmeath Senior Hurling Championship
Westmeath Senior Hurling Championship